Cyclopogon cranichoides is a terrestrial species of orchid. It is found across much of the West Indies as well as in Central America (Belize  ), northwestern South America (Colombia, Venezuela, Ecuador, Peru) and Florida.

References

External links 
IOSPE orchid photos, Cyclopogon cranichoides (Griseb.) Schltr. 1921 Photo by © Carl Luer and courtesy of The Swiss Orchid Foundation and the At Jany Renz Herbarium Website
Plants of Saint Lucia, wild flowering plants, Cyclopogon cranichoides 
Leigthon Photography & Imaging, Speckled Ladies'-tresses (Cyclopogon cranichoides) 

Spiranthinae
Plants described in 1866
Orchids of South America
Orchids of Central America
Orchids of Belize
Flora of the Caribbean
Orchids of Florida
Flora without expected TNC conservation status